Punlapa Margaret Taylor-Buttery (January 20, 1983), also known as Paula Taylor or Thai name Punlapa Supa-aksorn, is a Thai  actress, model, and presenter of British descent.

Personal life
Taylor was born in Chulalongkorn hospital, Bangkok, Thailand. Two weeks after she was born, the family moved to Australia. Her mother is of Thai Chinese descent and her father is of English descent. She grew up in Perth, Western Australia and at the age of 9, after her parents' divorce, moved to Brisbane, Queensland. Taylor got a bachelor in Business Administration from Assumption University

Career
While visiting her family in Thailand, she was asked if she would be interested in doing some modelling. She started her career in several commercials and small Thai movies before becoming a regular VJ for Channel V Thailand. Discovered by television producer Tanawat Wansom, she quickly rose to fame and became a sought-after television hostess and presenter. In 2006, she co-starred in the Thai romance comedy film The Memory.

The Amazing Race Asia 2
Taylor also participated in The Amazing Race Asia 2 with her childhood friend Natasha Monks. At the 9th leg they came in last but it was a non-elimination leg. In Leg 10, however, which was in Hungary, they came last for the second time, leading them to be the 6th eliminated pair. They finished 5th in the race.

On the Amazing Race Asia 3, she appeared alongside host Allan Wu as the local greeter at the Pit Stop of the first leg.

Present
Taylor made her Hollywood debut starring opposite William Hurt and Cary Elwes in the 2011 film Hellgate. Due to her exposure in the Amazing Race Asia, her face and name have become familiar in several Southeast Asian countries. In 2009 she landed the starring role in a film starring Filipino comedian Vic Sotto in Love On Line where she plays a version of herself.  She was also a guest host on Eat Bulaga! in which Sotto is a regular. She appears on the Philippine TV Sunday variety show SOP. She currently resides in Hong Kong and London and is mainly focusing on raising her children but she still travels around Asia for commercials and television guest appearances.

Personal life
Taylor married Anglo-Chinese businessman Edward Buttery in 2010. They have three children.

Filmography

Movies

Television

Music videos
 "Yah Lop Tah" by JR-Voy
 "Sexy" by Paradox
 "Tell Me Your Name" by Christian Bautista
 Maak Maai by Bie The Star

References

External links
 

1983 births
Paula Taylor
Living people
Paula Taylor
Paula Taylor
Paula Taylor
Paula Taylor
Paula Taylor
Paula Taylor
VJs (media personalities)
The Amazing Race contestants